East China Sea Fleet, China Marine Surveillance is under command of both East China Sea Branch, State Oceanic Administration and China Marine Surveillance.

Overview 
The present commander is Zhang Huirong.

Organization 
 4th Marine Surveillance Flotilla. Homeport: Ningbo, Zhejiang.
 5th Marine Surveillance Flotilla. Homeport: Pudong, Shanghai.
 6th Marine Surveillance Flotilla (. Homeport: Xiamen, Fujian.
 East China Sea Air Wing. Base:?

References 

China Marine Surveillance
East China Sea